Weissach is a municipality in the district of Böblingen in Baden-Württemberg in Germany.

The Weissach axle is named after the town, where the research centre of Porsche is located. The Porsche 918 Spyder supercar was developed in Weissach; Porsche offered an optional  "Weissach package" that featured reduced weight and improved aerodynamics.

Erich Hartmann (born April 19, 1922 in Weissach; died September 20, 1993 in Weil im Schönbuch) was a Luftwaffe pilot in World War 2. With 352 confirmed kills, he was the most successful fighter pilot in the history of air combat.

Mayors
 1948–1972: Herrmann Kempf
 1973–1997: Wolfgang Lucas
 1997–2005: Roland Portmann
 2005–2006: Reinhard Riesch
 2006–2014: Ursula Kreutel
 2014–2022: Daniel Töpfer
 since 2022: Jens Millow

References

Böblingen (district)
Württemberg